The 1998 VCU Rams men's soccer team represented Virginia Commonwealth University during the 1998 NCAA Division I men's soccer season. The Rams played in the Colonial Athletic Association for their fourth. It was the program's 21st season fielding a men's varsity college soccer program.

The Rams entered the season as the defending CAA Men's Soccer Tournament champions. The Rams were able to win the conference regular season title, before falling in the CAA Semifinals to Richmond. The Rams earned an at-large berth into the NCAA Tournament, where they fell in overtime to South Carolina.

Roster 

 Kevin Jeffrey 
 Ricardo Capilla
 Trevor Spencer
 Matt Kirkpatrick
 Dwayne Bergeron
 Roberto Gutierrez 
 Andy Kish
 Lorenz Baumgartner
 Erwan LeCrom
 Kofi Sey
 Jose Maldanado 
 Dominic Amato
 Gilberto Bejarano
 Guillermo Henriques
 Brian James
 Khomeini Talbot
 Adam Mead

Schedule 

|-
!colspan=6 style="background:#000000; color:#F8B800;"| Preseason
|-
!colspan=6 style="background:#000000; color:#F8B800;"| Regular season
|-

|-

Statistics 
Below are player statistics.

Goalkeeper statistics

References 
General
 
Footnotes

Vcu Rams
VCU Rams men's soccer seasons
Vcu Rams, Soccer
Vcu Rams